"Somebody's Somebody" is a song from Prince's (his stage name at that time being an unpronounceable symbol, see cover art) 1996 album Emancipation.

The song is an R&B ballad about Prince being lonely and wanting someone to hold and wanting to be "somebody's somebody". The US promotional release was sent to urban radio stations at the same time that "The Holy River" was sent to pop radio stations, and the song achieved moderate success at urban radio peaking at number 15 on Billboard's Hot R&B/Hip-Hop Airplay chart. In other countries the song was released as a double A-side with "The Holy River". Excluding the re-release of "1999", "The Holy River"/"Somebody's Somebody" became his final UK Top 40 single in his lifetime.

Charts

* 1 "The Holy River" / "Somebody's Somebody"

References

Prince (musician) songs
1997 singles
1990s ballads
Contemporary R&B ballads
Songs written by Prince (musician)
Music videos directed by Prince (musician)
NPG Records singles
EMI Records singles
Song recordings produced by Prince (musician)
1997 songs